Topsham railway station is the railway station serving the town of Topsham in the English county of Devon. It is the passing place for the otherwise single-track branch line from Exmouth Junction to Exmouth.  Both the loop and adjacent level crossing are remotely worked from the signal box at Exmouth Junction.

History
The station, with buildings designed by Sir William Tite, opened with the railway on 1 May 1861.  On 23 September 1861 a  branch was opened from the south end of the station, which dropped steeply to the wharf on the River Exe.

The station was initially owned by the London and South Western Railway.  In 1923 this became a constituent of the Southern Railway which, in turn was nationalised in 1948.  Following the privatisation of British Rail it was operated by Wessex Trains but the franchise has now been transferred to Great Western Railway.

Facilities 
There is a ticket machine on platform 1, and waiting areas on both platforms. Both platforms have step-free access.

Services

References

External links

Railway stations in Exeter
Former London and South Western Railway stations
Railway stations in Great Britain opened in 1861
Railway stations served by Great Western Railway
William Tite railway stations
1861 establishments in England
DfT Category F2 stations